Feyonda Fitzgerald (born April 15, 1995) is an American professional basketball player.

Career 
She played for Panathinaikos in the Greek League for the second half of the 2021–22.

College statistics

WNBA 
Fitzgerald was selected in the second round of the 2017 WNBA Draft (20th overall) by the Indiana Fever. She was with the Connecticut Sun for two games, before she was waived.

External links 
 Feyonda Fitzgerald - Women's Basketball - Temple Owls bio

References 

1995 births
Living people
American expatriate basketball people in Greece
American expatriate basketball people in Israel
American expatriate basketball people in Italy
American expatriate basketball people in Poland
American women's basketball players
Basketball players from Virginia
Connecticut Sun players
Guards (basketball)
Indiana Fever draft picks
Panathinaikos WBC players
Temple Owls women's basketball players